Paul Geddes (born 19 April 1961 in Paisley) is a Scottish former professional footballer who played in the Football League, as a central defender.

References

Sources

1961 births
Living people
Footballers from Paisley, Renfrewshire
Scottish footballers
Association football central defenders
Leicester City F.C. players
Hibernian F.C. players
Wimbledon F.C. players
Shepshed Dynamo F.C. players
Rugby Town F.C. players
English Football League players